Gangapur City railway station is the station on New Delhi–Mumbai main line in Gangapur city. It is best source of transportation for nearby minor cities and villages.

Gangapur City is a railway station on the Delhi–Kota–Vadodara–Mumbai railway line and it is abbreviated as GGC. Many of the major trains on this route halt at Gangapur City Railway Station. It lies in West Central Railway zone under Kota Division. Gangapur City is directly connected to major cities like Delhi, Mumbai, Jaipur, Kota, Agra, Indore, Mathura, Patna, Jammu, Amritsar & Udaipur.
Nearest railway stations are  & , .

Gallery

References 

Railway stations in Sawai Madhopur district
Kota railway division